The swimming competitions at the 2019 Southeast Asian Games in Manila are being held at the New Clark City Aquatics Center from 4 to 9 December 2019. It is one of four aquatic sports at the Games, along with diving, open water swimming, and water polo.

Summary 
Singapore improved on its last SEA Games result and won over half the available gold medals, 23 out of 38, to be the first in swimming events again with a total of 37 medals. Singapore won all the relay events and set 13 Games records and seven Singaporean national records. Vietnam finished in second with 10 gold medals and 25 medals in total.

A total of 20 Games records and 35 national records were broken.

Participating nations

Medal table

Medalists

Men

Women

References

External links
 

2019
Southeast Asian Games
2019 Southeast Asian Games events